Davide Munari (born 27 January 2000) is an Italian professional footballer who plays as a midfielder for  club Piacenza.

Club career
Born in Asiago, Munari started his career on Bassano and Torino youth system.

On 5 January 2019, he was loaned to Serie D club Cesena, on this team he made his senior debut.

He returned to Torino the next season, stil 1 February 2020 Munari signed for Cesena.

On 21 January 2022, he moved on loan to Piacenza. On 15 June 2022, Piacenza exercised their option to buy.

References

External links
 
 

2000 births
Living people
People from Asiago
Footballers from Veneto
Italian footballers
Association football midfielders
Serie C players
Serie D players
Cesena F.C. players
Piacenza Calcio 1919 players
Sportspeople from the Province of Vicenza